Marc Alan Miller (born August 24, 1975, in Grand Rapids, MI) is an American professional race car driver.  Miller has twice competed in the 24 Hours of Le Mans and most recently in the Continental Tire SportsCar Challenge in 2016 in the  GS class.

Career

Miller began his career in karting, at the age of 11. He has raced in a variety of cars including karts, open-wheel, stock, and sportscars.

Karting

Winner, United States Rotax Championship in 2008.

Stock cars
Miller competed part-time in CASCAR and CASCAR West, the Canadian offshoot of NASCAR from 2003 to 2006. Marc was the only American driver to compete in the series.

Sports car racing
In 2009 Miller was the runner up in the Mazda MX-5 Cup Championship.  From 2012 to present Marc has driven for CJ Wilson of baseball fame's racing team, in the Continental Tire Sports Car Challenge. Concurrently Miller has driven a Dodge Viper for Riley Motorsports in the 2015 and 2016, 24 Hours of Le Mans.  Marc Miller was featured on Season 2 of the Dinner With Racers Podcast.

Personal life
Miller lives in Holland, Michigan with two sons (who as of 2016 are 11 and 9), one of which has autism, prompting Miller bring awareness to the neurodevelopment disease.

Racing Record

Complete WeatherTech SportsCar Championship results
(key) (Races in bold indicate pole position; results in italics indicate fastest lap)

† Miller did not complete sufficient laps in order to score full points.

References

External links
Official website

Living people
1975 births
GT World Challenge America drivers
Porsche Motorsports drivers
Michelin Pilot Challenge drivers
WeatherTech SportsCar Championship drivers
24 Hours of Le Mans drivers